Princess Prabha Bannabilaya (13 August 1885 – 8 September 1948) was the Princess of Siam (later Thailand. She was a member of Siamese Royal Family. She is a daughter of Chulalongkorn, King Rama V of Siam.

Her mother was Chao Chom Manda Phrom (daughter of Phraya Phitsanuloka Thibodi). She had 3 siblings; 1 elder sister, 1 younger brother and 1 younger sister;
 Princess Prabai Bannabilas (13 August 1885 – 17 September 1886) Princess Prabha Bannabilaya' twin younger sister.
 Prince Samaya Vudhirodom (13 September 1888 – 9 December 1889)
 Princess Vapi Busbakara (25 June 1891 – 15 December 1982)

Princess Prabha Bannabilaya and Princess Prabai Bannabilas were the only twin couple of King Chulalongkorn, and they were the 4th twin couple in Chakri Dynasty. The three previous twin couple were:
 Prince and Princess twin of Prince Boworn Maha Senanurak and Chao Chom Manda Sabaya, they died after birth in 1810
 Princess twins of King Buddha Loetla Nabhalai and Chao Chom Manda Nhu Chin, died a week after birth in 1811
 Prince twins of Prince Yodyingyos, the Prince Bowornwichaicharn and Chao Chom Manda Mom Luang Prik Chesdankura, died a year after birth in 1857.

Princess Prabha Bannabilaya died on 8 September 1948, at the age of 63. The Royal Cremation was created on 23 April 1950, in the same crematorium of King Ananda Mahidol's crematorium. The Royal Cremation was performed by King Bhumibol Adulyadej

Ancestry

1885 births
1948 deaths
19th-century Thai women
19th-century Chakri dynasty
20th-century Thai women
20th-century Chakri dynasty
Thai female Phra Ong Chao
Children of Chulalongkorn
Daughters of kings